Vaddera (alternatively Vadde, Waddera, Vadar) is a caste in Andhra Pradesh, Tamil Nadu, Maharashtra and some other states in India.

The Vaddera have traditionally been stone cutters but many have had to change to agricultural labouring. The effects of mechanisation, usually financed and run by higher caste groups, has caused this change and government recognition of the issues has led to them being designated as an Other Backward Class.

Some Vaddera families in Chilakaluripet, Andhra Pradesh,  have been noted as forming a network to groom children for sexual exploitation.

References 

Indian castes
Social groups of Tamil Nadu